Enzo Kofi Kuworge (born 31 August 2001) is a Dutch weightlifter. He became junior super heavyweight world champion at the 2021 Junior World Weightlifting Championships held in Tashkent, Uzbekistan. He represented the Netherlands at the 2020 Summer Olympics in Tokyo, Japan.

In 2018, he won the bronze medal in the boys' +85kg event at the Summer Youth Olympics held in Buenos Aires, Argentina.

Career 

At the 2017 European Youth Weightlifting Championships held in Pristina, Kosovo, he won the bronze medal in the clean & jerk and the silver medal in total in the men's +94kg. He repeated this in 2018 at the European Youth Weightlifting Championships held in San Donato Milanese, Italy but added a gold medal in the clean & jerk and a silver medal in the snatch. A few months later, he competed at the 2018 Summer Youth Olympics held in Buenos Aires, Argentina where he broke all national senior records and won the bronze medal.

In 2019, at the British International Open held in Coventry, Great Britain, he won the bronze medal in the men's +109kg event. A few months later, he competed in the men's +109 kg event at the 2019 World Weightlifting Championships held in Pattaya, Thailand without winning a medal. At the 2019 European Junior & U23 Weightlifting Championships held in Bucharest, Romania, he won the silver medal in the men's junior +109 kg event.

In 2020, he finished in 6th place in the men's +109kg event at the Roma 2020 World Cup in Rome, Italy.

In April 2021, he finished in 11th place in the men's +109kg event at the European Weightlifting Championships held in Moscow, Russia. In May 2021, he won the gold medal in his event at the Junior World Weightlifting Championships held in Tashkent, Uzbekistan.

He competed in the men's +109kg event at the 2020 Summer Olympics in Tokyo, Japan. It was the first time a weightlifter from the Netherlands competed at the Summer Olympics in over fifty years. He finished in 6th place with a lift of 175 kg in the Snatch, 234 kg in the Clean & Jerk and 409 kg in total. A few months later, he won the gold medal in the men's junior +109kg event at the 2021 European Junior & U23 Weightlifting Championships held in Rovaniemi, Finland. In December 2021, he competed in the men's +109kg event at the World Weightlifting Championships held in Tashkent, Uzbekistan. He finished in 10th place. In that same month, he won the Young Talent Award 2020/2021 at the NOC*NSF Sports Gala.

He competed in the men's +109kg event at the 2022 European Weightlifting Championships held in Tirana, Albania.

Personal life 

He has a Ghanaian father and a Dutch mother.

Achievements

Notes

References

External links 

 

Living people
2001 births
Sportspeople from Nijmegen
Dutch male weightlifters
Weightlifters at the 2018 Summer Youth Olympics
Weightlifters at the 2020 Summer Olympics
Olympic weightlifters of the Netherlands
21st-century Dutch people